The Mayagüez Athletics Stadium is 12,175 capacity stadium  in Mayagüez, Puerto Rico  opened in 2010.
The stadium is owned by City of Mayaguez, and operated by Puerto Rico Sol. It hosted the athletics and soccer games of the 2010 Central American and Caribbean Games. The stadium has a soccer field (105 meters x 66 meters) based on the requisites of International Federation of Association Football, it will also have a 400-meter track which complies with the parameter of the International Association of Athletics Federations.

It is located next to the Isidoro García Baseball Stadium and across the street of the Parque del Litoral. The first mayor event held at the stadium was the "Justas" of the Liga Atlética Interuniversitaria de Puerto Rico held between April 12 to 17, 2010. From July 15 to July 17 the stadium was host to the 2011 Central American and Caribbean Championships in Athletics.

Events

Association football

Gallery

External links
Stadium information
Designs of stadium

References

Football venues in Puerto Rico
Sports in Mayagüez, Puerto Rico
Buildings and structures in Mayagüez, Puerto Rico
2010 Central American and Caribbean Games venues
2010 establishments in Puerto Rico
Sports venues completed in 2010
Athletics (track and field) venues in Puerto Rico